Dutch Braille is the braille alphabet used for the Dutch language in the Netherlands and in Flanders.

History 
In the Netherlands, braille was introduced in 1890. In Belgium, braille has been in use at least since the foundation of the Brailleliga in 1922, but probably earlier.

Over the course of time, five different braille alphabets have been in use. One of these early alphabets was based on the pronunciation of Dutch. It is still used for example by office clerks and students for making notes.

In 1946, the Vlaams-Nederlandse Braille-commissie (Flemish–Netherlands Braille Committee) was founded to decide on a uniform braille alphabet for the Dutch language. This was introduced in 1947.

Alphabet 

Netherland Braille assigns international y to the vowel ij. Three letters for print digraphs follow German Braille (though Dutch oe  is pronounced very differently from German oe/ö).

For letters with diacritics in foreign words, French Braille is used. Where this conflicts with Dutch values (y/ij, ö/oe, ô/ch, û/sch), a dot-6 prefix is used to specify the French reading:  y,  û.

Unesco (2013) presents a Dutch Braille alphabet that is identical to the French.  It appears that this is Belgian Dutch Braille.

Punctuation 

Unesco (2013) has the opposite assignments for parentheses and quotation marks,  and  respectively. This appears to be Belgian usage.

Formatting

See also

 Moon type is a simplification of the Latin alphabet for embossing. An adaptation of Dutch-reading blind people has been proposed.

References 

Braille-autoriteit voor het Nederlandse taalgebied 

French-ordered braille alphabets
Braille